Jake Metcalfe (born 1958) is an attorney, union manager, and politician, a former chair of the Alaska Democratic Party  and a former Anchorage School Board President.  On July 30, 2007, Metcalfe announced his intention to run for Alaska's At-large congressional district in 2008. In May 2008, he dropped out of the race, after a former campaign worker was accused of establishing fake websites about one of his primary opponents, Ethan Berkowitz .

His biography is as follows:

James Kerr "Jake" Metcalfe is a fourth generation Alaskan, born on April 3, 1958, in Juneau, Alaska. His maternal great-grandfather, Patrick Flynn, came to Alaska at the turn of the 20th century to help build and work on the White Pass and Yukon Route from Skagway, Alaska to the Yukon Territory.

On his father's side, the family moved from central Washington to Juneau and started Metcalfe's Sheet Metal in 1941. After service with the U.S. Army, Vern Metcalfe, Sr. returned to Juneau where he married lifelong Juneau resident Pat McAlister in 1948. They had nine children, seven of whom still live in Alaska. Jake's father, Vern, served in the Legislature of the Alaska Territory during the mid-1950s and later became a well known radio broadcaster, newspaper editor and pioneer TV reporter in Juneau. Two siblings, Peter and Kim Metcalfe, have written books on Alaska Native History.

Jake started work at the age of five, helping his big brothers sell newspapers, and by the age of eight, he had his own business, a shoeshine stand in a popular barber shop where he shined the shoes of most of Alaska's leading politicians.

A 1976 graduate of Juneau-Douglas High School, Jake worked as a cold storage worker, commercial fisherman, bartender and legislative employee while paying his way through college. He earned a BA in History from Eastern Michigan University in 1986, and his Juris Doctor degree from Lewis & Clark Law School four years later.

Beginning in 1990, Jake launched his legal career as a state prosecutor. Appointed by Governor Walter Joseph Hickel as District Attorney in Bethel, Alaska, he supervised one of Alaska's busiest criminal prosecution offices. During his four years in Bethel, Jake served a two-year term on the Bethel City Council.

In 1997, Jake moved to Anchorage and began working as associate general counsel for the International Brotherhood of Electrical Workers Local 1547 and later stepped up to General Counsel in 2004.

In Anchorage, Jake has served on the Anchorage Airport Advisory Council and his community council. In 2001, he was elected to the Anchorage School Board. He served two 3-year terms on the School Board and as President of the School Board for two consecutive terms.

In 2009, he began serving as Executive Director of the Public Safety Employees' Association Local 803.

In January 2018, he began work as the Executive Director of ASEA (Alaska State Employee Association).

He is married to Moira Smith. He has 4 children, Bienvinedo V. Metcalfe, Peter A. Metcalfe, Margaret K. Metcalfe, and Owen J. Metcalfe.

References

1958 births
Alaska city council members
Alaska Democrats
Alaska lawyers
Eastern Michigan University alumni
Lewis & Clark Law School alumni
Living people
Politicians from Anchorage, Alaska
People from Bethel, Alaska
Politicians from Juneau, Alaska
School board members in Alaska
State political party chairs of Alaska
Lawyers from Anchorage, Alaska